The Klaarkampstermeermolen or Klaarkampstermolen is a polder windmill in Rinsumageast, Friesland, the Netherlands. Built in 1862 the smock mill was relocated to its current position in 1893 and has been restored several times. Worked by volunteers it still drains the Klaarkampstermeer as of 2022. The mill is listed as a Rijksmonument since 1970 and can be visited by appointment.

History
De Klaarkampstermeermolen was originally built in 1862 at the Juckemavaart canal. It was moved to its current site in 1893 to drain the  Klaarkampstermeer. The mill was restored in 1975 and an electric pump was installed. During a further restoration in 1991 the wooden windshaft was replaced by a cast iron one, cast by Gieterij Hardinxveld of Hardinxveld-Giessendam, South Holland. A further restoration was undertaken in 2009. The mill is listed as a Rijksmonument, №11695.

Description

De Klaarkampstermeermolen is a grondzeiler, the mill can be set to the wind from the ground: as the sails almost touch the ground no stage is needed. It is a two-storey smock mill on a single-storey brick base. The mill is set to the wind by tailpole and winch. The smock and cap are thatched. The common sailssit on wings with a  span.

The windshaft carries the 47 cogs brake wheel that drives the wallower (24 cogs) at  the top of the upright shaft that has two crown wheels at the bottom end called the upper and the lower crown wheel. The upper crown wheel has 35 cogs and drives an Archimedes' screw. The lower crown wheel, which has 34 cogs is carried on the axle of an Archimedes' screw that drains the Klaarkampstermeer polder. The  diameter screw is inclined at 25.7° and each revolution lifts  of water.

Visiting
As per 2020 the Klaarkampstermeermolen was open to the public by appointment and on the first Saturday morning of each month.

References

Windmills in Friesland
Windmills completed in 1893
Smock mills in the Netherlands
Windpumps in the Netherlands
Agricultural buildings in the Netherlands
Rijksmonuments in Friesland
Octagonal buildings in the Netherlands